A list of the manufacturers of components that are specific to touch solutions.

Touchscreens

Capacitive 
Elo Touch Solutions, Inc.
3M
Alps Electric Corporation
Atmel
Cirque
Cypress
SCHURTER Input Systems
Synaptics
TouchNetix

Projected capacitive (PCAP) 
Elo Touch Solutions, Inc.
3M
Planar
Rocktouch
SCHURTER Input Systems
Visual Planet
TSI Touch
Zytronic

Infrared 
Neonode
TSI Touch
Baanto | SahdowSense

Surface acoustic wave (SAW) 
Planar

Bending wave
3M

Resistive

4-wire 
Planar
SCHURTER Input Systems

5-wire 
Elo Touch Solutions, Inc.
SCHURTER Input Systems

Touchpads 
These manufacturers provide components to touchpads or trackpads.

Capacitive 
Alps Electric Corporation
Cirque
Synaptics

Resistive 
Interlink

See also
Piezo touch solution

References

External links

Touch-solution